Ferryland Head Light is an active lighthouse on Avalon Peninsula, southeast of the village of Ferryland, Newfoundland and Labrador. It is situated at the end of a long peninsula that juts into the sea.

History
This lighthouse was built in 1871. It is a 14-metre tall cylindrical tower, painted red. Atop is a white lantern, a gallery, and a red roof. It was originally made of brick, but, since 1892, has been encased with iron. The lantern flashes white every six seconds. The original light has been replaced, and is now part of a display at the Ferryland Museum.

In August 2012, the Town of Ferryland became the new owners of this lighthouse. It is managed by the Irish Loop Development Board.

Keepers 
Michael Kearney 1871-1882 
William Costello 1882-1905 
John William Costello 1905-1927 
Augustan Costello 1927-1939 
William "Billy" Costello 1939-1970

See also
 List of lighthouses in Newfoundland and Labrador
 List of lighthouses in Canada

References

External links

 Aids to Navigation Canadian Coast Guard

Lighthouses completed in 1871
Lighthouses in Newfoundland and Labrador
1871 establishments in Canada
Lighthouses on the Canadian Register of Historic Places